Love in the First Degree may refer to:

Film and TV
Love in the First Degree, 2004 Australian comedy film with Joy Smithers and Alexandra Fowler

Music
"Love in the First Degree" (Alabama song), 1981
"Love in the First Degree" (Bananarama song), 1987
"Love in the first degree", a 1936 song written by Harvey Brooks